Sadahiro (written: 定博, 定広 or 貞博) is a masculine Japanese given name. Notable people with the name include:

, Japanese weightlifter
, Japanese rower
, Japanese sumo wrestler and coach

Japanese masculine given names